The Wolverhampton Art Gallery in Wolverhampton, England, has a collection of 114 historic tsuba from Japan. The  is usually a round (or occasionally squarish) guard at the end of the grip of bladed Japanese weapons, like the katana and its various variations. Items in the collection range from the Momoyama period (16th century) to the end of the Edo period (19th century).

History 

The  were part of a wider collection of weapons and sword guards donated by Councilor Davis Green in October 1924. Originally the collection belonged to a Mr. C.E.F. Griffiths and was loaned to the gallery. The collection was reclaimed by the family, it is presumed that Mr. Griffiths died, and put it up for auction at Dudley Auction Rooms. Councilor Green bought the whole collection for £350 and donated it to the gallery.

Collection 

Illustrated here is an example of a copper,  in the Hamano Nara style. The  has copper . The  (signature) reads: . The historian Henri L. Joly confirms that Masayuki is the same person as Shōzui, an important founder member of the Hamano branch of the Nara school. Mr. Hara Shinkichi and Naunton have identified that Shōzui also used the names Miboku and Otsuryūken. The dates for Masayuki are 1695–1796. 

During the Edo period (1603–1868) the Tokugawa shogunate had a very strict dress code for attending the court. Samurai were required to wear kamishimo, or court dress. They wore the hakama, kimono and a special outer kimono with 'wings'. The koshirae for the sword was also very precise. All the fittings were made of shakudō with a  ground. The designs were also formal and consisted of flowers, family crests (mon), the crest of a daimyō, kiri blossom (paulownia flowers), or a dragon in clouds. 

The  with gold  shown below in the image gallery is typical of the kind of  designed for use at court. It has a  design of a bird with foliage and flowers on a  ground. It is from the Kikugawa school popular during the latter part of the Tokugawa shogunate. The  reads , who is known to have been practicing during the later half of the nineteenth century. He was a pupil of Muneyoshi, who acquired the nickname  because of his skill carving chrysanthemums. Later he studied the work of Chizuka Hisanari.

Gallery

References

External links 
 Wolverhampton Arts & Culture – tsuba 

Samurai weapons and equipment
Wolverhampton
Museum collections